The Little Chute Windmill and Van Asten Visitor Center is a functioning Dutch smock mill and interpretive center in Little Chute, Wisconsin, United States. The authentic wooden windmill is a tribute to the Dutch heritage of the village and the larger area known as the Fox River Valley in Wisconsin. 
Tours take visitors to the different levels of the windmill, allowing visitors to see the actual operation of the mill as it harnesses wind power to grind grain into flour.

The windmill and visitor center is located at 130 West Main Street in Little Chute. The windmill operates during the warmer, summer months. The Visitor Center is open year-round but not on Sundays.

Windmill

The Windmill is an authentic 1850s design, based on similar mills from the province of North Brabant in the Netherlands, the home province of many of the first Dutch settlers to the area.  The 38-meter (125 ft) high wooden windmill was designed by fourth-generation millwright Lucas Verbij of Verbij Hoogmade BV in the Netherlands. The windmill was partially constructed in the Netherlands and shipped for final assembly in Little Chute.

Visitor Center
The Van Asten Visitor Center features displays on the history of Dutch settlement in Little Chute and the surrounding area. Displays, as well as archives, genealogy and research materials and work space, are managed by the Little Chute Historical Society. The Van Dyn Hoven Media Room, located inside Visitor Center, is available for rental and has audio/visual equipment that frequently shows photos of the windmill construction.

References

External links
Official website
Little Chute Historical Society

Dutch-American culture in Wisconsin
Buildings and structures by Dutch architects
Museums in Outagamie County, Wisconsin
Smock mills in the United States
Mill museums in Wisconsin
Flour mills in the United States
Dutch-American history
Grinding mills in Wisconsin
Windmills in Wisconsin